The Galilee earthquake of 363 was a pair of severe earthquakes that shook the Galilee and nearby regions on May 18 and 19. The maximum perceived intensity for the events was estimated to be VII (Very strong) on the Medvedev–Sponheuer–Karnik scale. The earthquakes occurred on the portion of the Dead Sea Transform (DST) fault system between the Dead Sea and the Gulf of Aqaba.

Impact

Sepphoris, north-northwest of Nazareth, was severely damaged. Nabratein and the Nabratein synagogue (northeast of Safed) were destroyed. The earthquake may have been responsible for the failure of the plan to rebuild the Temple in Jerusalem with the permission of the Emperor Julian.

Petra, in what is now Jordan, was fatally damaged.

See also
Geography of Israel#Seismic activity
List of historical earthquakes
List of earthquakes in the Levant

References

Sources

External links
 Petra: The Great Earthquake from the American Museum of Natural History

363
360s in the Byzantine Empire
4th-century earthquakes
0363 Galilee
4th-century natural disasters
Earthquakes in the Byzantine Empire